María Guðmundsdóttir (born 12 February 1942) is an Icelandic filmmaker, photographer and model. She is a former supermodel and Miss Iceland in 1961.

Biography
María was born in Reykjavík and grew up in Djúpavík until the age of 11. She was crowned Miss Iceland in 1961. By 1967, she was modeling for Eileen Ford in New York.

In 2015 she produced and directed the documentary Ferðin heim - smásögur úr Árneshreppi á Ströndum, about the people of Árneshreppur, the municipality where she grew up.

References

External links
 Ferðin heim - smásögur úr Árneshreppi á Ströndum Icelandic Films summary page

1942 births
Living people
Maria Gudmundsdottir
Maria Gudmundsdottir
Maria Gudmundsdottir
Maria Gudmundsdottir
Maria Gudmundsdottir
Maria Gudmundsdottir
Maria Gudmundsdottir